Flora Botton Beja (born 1 March 1933) is a Mexican sinologist and gender studies scholar. She was born in Greece, but acquired Spanish nationality through her parents and naturalized as Mexican after her arrival in Mexico in 1949. She was a co-founder of the gender studies and a pioneer of Oriental studies programs at El Colegio de México. She was one of the first academics to focus on China in Mexico and Latin America. Her works have widely been influential in the region and she was one of the founders of the Asociación Latinoamericana de Estudios de Asia y África (Latin-American Association of Asian and African Studies).

Early life and education
Flora Botton was born on 1 March 1933 in Thessaloniki, Greece, to Spanish nationals, Sara Beja and Jaime Botton (Botón) Saporta, who dealt in the textile industry. Her family were part of the Sephardic Jewish diaspora. When she was seven, Thessaloniki became an occupied territory, first by Italy and then in 1941 by the Nazis. Assisted by friends, the family fled to Athens which was still under the control of Benito Mussolini's forces. In early 1944, the Nazis took over the occupation and in April, Flora’s brother, parents, grandmother, aunts, uncles, and cousins were arrested in the middle of the night and transported to the Bergen-Belsen concentration camp. With the Allied Forces closing in, plans were made to transport prisoners to Austria. One week before the British liberation of the camp, three train loads carrying prisoners left the camp on 6, 7, and 9 April 1945. Close to five thousand evacuees in Botton's group were abandoned at Magdeburg where they were discovered by a Ninth United States Army soldier on patrol on 13 April. The Ninth Army had arrived in Magdeburg two days prior during the assault on the Ruhr pocket.

Cared for by the United Nations Relief and Rehabilitation Administration, the Botton family was evacuated in the summer of 1945 to Brussels, Belgium. After three months in a refugee camp, they were sent to Marseille, France, and continued on to Bari, Italy, finally arriving back in Athens in October. Jaime re-established his store, and Botton continued her education at the American School until 1949. That year at the end of the school term, the family moved to Mexico City, motivated by post-war tensions in Greece. Her paternal grandmother, Flor Saporta, after whom she was named, migrated with them. Botton completed her high schooling at the Colegios Garside, one of the first bilingual academies in Mexico. In 1950, she enrolled at Mexico City College, earning a Bachelor of Arts in philosophy, cum laude, in 1952 and continuing her studies there, completing a master's degree (also cum laude) in 1953. Furthering her education, Botton moved to Paris and studied European history and Spanish literature for a year at the Sorbonne.

Career
In 1955, Botton returned to Mexico City and began her career teaching in a private finishing school. She was hired to teach philosophy at her alma mater in 1956. In 1964, she was accepted into the first 2-year master's degree program in Oriental studies at El Colegio de México (Colmex). Between 1966 and 1968, Botton studied at the School of Oriental and African Studies at the University of London and then spent spent several months studying at the National Taiwan Normal University in Taipei. In 1969, she joined the Center for Asian and African Studies at Colmex. This was the first department in Latin America to focus on Chinese studies. Funded by UNESCO the program was initially taught by visiting scholars from around the world with the plan to replace the teaching staff with Mexicans once they were trained. Botton became the first Mexican sinologist to join the center. Between 1972 and 1974 she worked on her doctorate, studying modern and classical Chinese language, history, and culture at the University of Michigan.

Botton was one of the founding editors of Fem in 1976 and remained on the editorial board until 1990. That same year, she became one of the founders of the Asociación Latinoamericana de Estudios de Asia y África (Latin-American Association of Asian and African Studies). Between 1978 and 1980 she served as a cultural attaché at the Mexican Embassy in Beijing, China. She returned to Mexico in 1981 and served as the director of the journal  until 1987. In 1991, she became the director of the Center for Asian and African Studies at Colmex, serving until 1997. In addition to teaching at Colmex, Botton, a naturalized Mexican, has been a visiting professor at the Autonomous University of Madrid, Harvard University, the Hebrew University of Jerusalem, Institute of Southeast Asian Studies in Singapore, and Renmin University of China in Beijing, among many others.

Awards and recognition
Botton is a member of the Sistema Nacional de Investigadores (National System of Researchers). In 2012, a group of her students published China: estudios y ensayos en honor de Flora Botton Beja (China, Studies and Essays in Honor of Flora Botton Beja) in recognition of her influence over Sinology in Latin America. She was honored in Chile in 2016 for her work in founding the Asociación Latinoamericana de Estudios de Asia y África (Latin-American Association of Asian and African Studies). The 5th International Congress on Chinese Studies, hosted in March 2020, was held in her honor, recognizing her pioneering role in the field. In 2021, Arizpe, Botton, and Urrutia (posthumously) were recognized for their founding of the gender studies program at Colmex.

Selected works
Botton has extensively published varied works on China. Her preliminary works dealt with Chinese philosophy, but she moved into studies of history and then contemporary cultural and social issues.

Books
 (Second edition published in 2000.)

 (Second edition published in 2018.)

Notes

References

Citations

Bibliography

1933 births
Living people
Holocaust survivors
Mexico City College alumni
University of Paris alumni
National Autonomous University of Mexico alumni
El Colegio de México alumni
Academic staff of El Colegio de México
Gender studies academics
Mexican ethnographers
Sinologists
Greek emigrants to Mexico
Jews from Thessaloniki
Mexican Jews